Barry Schwabsky (b. Paterson, New Jersey, in 1957) is an American art critic, art historian and poet. He has taught at the School of Visual Arts, Pratt Institute, New York University, Yale University, and Goldsmiths College, among others.

Art criticism
Schwabsky is art critic for The Nation (the oldest continuously published weekly magazine in the United States) and co-editor of international reviews for Artforum. Schwabsky's essays have appeared in many other publications, including Flash Art, Contemporary, Artforum, London Review of Books and Art in America.

His art criticism books include: Words for Art: Criticism, History, Theory, Practice (Ram Publications); The Widening Circle: Consequences of Modernism in Contemporary Art (Cambridge University Press); and contributions to Abstract Painting: Concepts and Techniques and Vitamin P: New Perspectives in Painting (Phaidon Press). He has published books on Jessica Stockholder (Phaidon Press), Mel Bochner, Chloe Piene, Karin Davie, Dana Schutz, Alex Katz, Gillian Wearing: Mass Observation (Merrill Publishers), Henri Matisse and Alighiero Boetti, among others.

He was an early contributor to The Thing.

Published poetry
Trembling Hand Equilibrium (Black Square Editions)
Book Left Open in the Rain (Black Square Editions/The Brooklyn Rail)
12 Abandoned Poems (Kilmog Press)
Poems 1981–2002 (Meritage Press)
Fate/Seen in the Dark (Burning Deck)

Personal life 
Schwabsky attended Haverford College (class of 1979) and is married to artist Carol Szymanski. They reside in New York City with their two daughters.

Notes and references

See also
Post-conceptual art
Postmodern art
 "Vitamin P3: New Perspectives in Painting." Phaidon Press, 2017. 

American art critics
American art historians
Living people
American art curators
Cultural historians
The Nation (U.S. magazine) people
Year of birth missing (living people)